The genus Brachystelma is represented by over a hundred species in the world, chiefly distributed in South Africa, South-East Asia and Australasia. In India, 17 species are known to occur, of which nine are endemic.

Species
The genus contains some 154 species, including:

 Brachystelma parviflorum (Wight) Hook.f. 
 Brachystelma attenuatum (Wight) Hook.f. 
 Brachystelma natalense (Schltr.) N.E.Br.
 Brachystelma schinzii (K.Schum.) N.E.Br.
 Brachystelma schultzei (Schltr.) Bruyns
 Brachystelma tumakurense Gundappa, Sringesw., Vishwan. & Venu
 Brachystelma vahrmeijeri (Schltr.) Bruyns
 Brachystelma seshachalamense

References

 
Apocynaceae genera
Taxonomy articles created by Polbot